This is a list of dams and reservoirs in Nepal. It includes large barrages and weirs.

Province 1

Province 2
Koshi Barrage

Bagmati province
Dhap Dam
Kulekhani Reservoir
Nagmati Dam
Saptakoshi High Dam

Gandaki province
Kaligandaki Dam

Lumbini province

Karnali province

Sudur Paschim province
West Seti Dam

See also
List of power stations in Nepal

References

Dams in Nepal